Keith Anthony Prince is a British Conservative Party politician and Member of the London Assembly for Havering and Redbridge since 2016.

Prince served as a councillor in Havering from 1990 to 1994, representing Gidea Park ward, and then as a councillor in Redbridge Barkingside Ward from 2003 until 2018, serving as leader of the council between 2009 and 2014, in coalition with the Liberal Democrats after May 2010.

In 2017, Prince was involved in a heated row with a fellow passenger on a train, on his daily commute to work on the Southeastern train service from Dartford to London. The confrontation was filmed and received attention on social media and in print and broadcast media. Prince subsequently released a statement, stating that “I’d like to apologise to my fellow commuters for the disturbance our initial disagreement caused."

References

External links 
 Keith Prince at the London Assembly
 at Havering and Redbridge

Conservative Members of the London Assembly
Living people
Year of birth missing (living people)